Jodhpur Airport  is a domestic airport and an Indian Air Force base serving the city of Jodhpur, Rajasthan, India. It is operated by the Airports Authority of India (AAI) and shares its airside with the Jodhpur Air Force Station of the Indian Air Force.

The Government of Rajasthan signed a Memorandum of Understanding (MoU) with the Indian Air Force for the expansion of the passenger terminal in March 2017, wherein 37 acres of IAF land would be transferred to AAI. In May 2021, it was transferred by IAF to AAI through Jodhpur Development Authority (JoDA), and the terminal was built. It is the 44th busiest airport in India, handling more than half a million passengers in FY 2018–2019.

History
The Jodhpur Flying Club was set up by Maharaja Umaid Singh in the 1920s at a small airfield near his Chittar Palace (Umaid Bhavan Palace) in Jodhpur. Through the next three decades, the airfield grew in stature, being used as an airfield for the Royal Air Force (RAF) during World War II. The airfield was upgraded in 1950 after the formation of the Royal Indian Air Force (which later became the Indian Air Force). Jodhpur was home to the IAF's Air Force Flying College until the 1965 war.

Structure
The airport's 12-acre civil enclave contains a terminal building measuring a built-up area of 5,690 m2, which is capable of handling 430 passengers per hour. The terminal has seven check-in counters and three boarding gates. The adjoining concrete apron measures 140 by 100 metres and has three parking bays that can cater to two Airbus A320 and Boeing 737 type aircraft simultaneously.

The runway is 2,743 metres long and 45 metres wide. The airfield is equipped with night landing facilities and an Instrument Landing System (ILS) as well as navigational facilities like DVOR/DME and an NDB.

Jodhpur Air Force Station
Squadrons of HAL Dhruv, Mikoyan MiG-27, Mil Mi-17 and Sukhoi Su-30MKI aircraft are based here. It was active during the Kargil War of 1999. There is also a battalion of the Garud Commando Force here.

On 3 October 2022, IAF inducted HAL Prachand into 143 Helicopter Unit at Jodhpur Air Force Station.

Airlines and destinations

Statistics

See also
 Airports in India
 List of busiest airports in India by passenger traffic

References

External links
 Jodhpur Airport webpage at official Airports Authority of India web site.
 Times of India - "Aviator Maharaja"
 Dainik Bhasker - "spicejet may start ten flights from jodhpur"

Airports in Rajasthan
Buildings and structures in Jodhpur
Transport in Jodhpur
World War II sites in India
1920s establishments in India